Paul Bernard Fisher (born 19 December 1954) is an English educationalist, who served as headmaster of Loughborough Grammar School from 1998 - 2016, and who previously played first-class cricket for Middlesex, Worcestershire and Oxford University.
He was very much a specialist wicket-keeper, with a batting average in single figures in both forms of the game.

Fisher was born in Edmonton, Middlesex. and was educated at St Ignatius' College and Christ Church, Oxford, where he read Literae Humaniores.

In August 1973, aged 18, he kept wicket for Middlesex Young Cricketers against Buckinghamshire Young Amateurs at Hoovers Sports Ground, Wembley; the Middlesex side also included a 16-year-old Mike Gatting.
Early the following year, Fisher made his first-class debut, for Oxford against Leicestershire at The University Parks, taking a catch to dismiss opposition keeper Roger Tolchard and scoring 14 and 15.
He played six further games for Oxford that season, ending 1974 with 13 catches.
He also played for Essex Second XI.
In 1975, Fisher continued to play for Oxford, hitting his highest score of 42 against Warwickshire in June,. Fisher played in the University Matches of 1975 1976, 1977 and 1978, finishing on the winning side in 1976 (all the other matches were drawn).

Fisher made his List A debut for the Combined Universities) in 1975 away against Warwickshire; he played eight further List A matches for the Combined Unis, who never made it out of the group stages.

Fisher made his debut in county cricket in August 1979, playing for Middlesex against Worcestershire at Lord's; he would only play two further matches for Middlesex; a first-class match against Nottinghamshire at Trent Bridge and a List A match against Hampshire at Dean Park

For the 1980 season, he moved to Worcestershire, with whom he remained the following year as well, but he never managed to hold down a regular spot as keeper in the face of strong competition from David Humphries. He made his county debut for Worcestershire on 6 August 1980 against Gloucestershire, taking 5 catches in Glouc's first innings. He made three List A appearances for Worcestershire in 1980. The last game of his career was for Worcestershire against the Australians at Worcester in late August 1981; Fisher bowed out quietly with just one dismissal, that of Australian captain Kim Hughes.

Fisher worked as a teacher at Marlborough College and Prior Park College before coming Headmaster of Mount St Mary's College and from 1998 to 2016 Loughborough Grammar School. Fisher recently completed the London Marathon in 4 hrs 30 mins along with a team from the University Match in aid of multiple sclerosis.

References

External links
 
 Statistical summary from CricketArchive

1954 births
Living people
English cricketers
Middlesex cricketers
Worcestershire cricketers
Oxford University cricketers
People educated at St Ignatius' College, Enfield
Alumni of Christ Church, Oxford
British Universities cricketers
Wicket-keepers